The 2018–19 Biathlon World Cup – Stage 9 was the 9th and final event of the season and was held in Oslo, Holmenkollen, Norway, from 21–24 March 2019.

Schedule of events 
The events took place at the following times.

Medal winners

Men

Women

References 

2018–19 Biathlon World Cup
Biathlon World Cup
Biathlon World Cup
2010s in Oslo
Biathlon competitions in Norway
International sports competitions in Oslo